The 2015–16 season was Krško's 1st season in the Slovenian PrvaLiga, Slovenian top division.

Players
As of 1 March 2016.

Source:NK Krško

Competitions

Overall

Overview
{| class="wikitable" style="text-align: center"
|-
!rowspan=2|Competition
!colspan=8|Record
|-
!
!
!
!
!
!
!
!
|-
| PrvaLiga

|-
! Total

PrvaLiga

League table

Results summary

Results by round

Matches

Statistics

Squad statistics

Goalscorers

See also
2015–16 Slovenian PrvaLiga

References

External links
Official website 
Krsko on soccerway
NK Krško YouTube

Slovenian football clubs 2015–16 season